Two cutters of the United States Coast Guard have been named Walnut

, a  tender commissioned 27 June 1939 originally WAGL-252.
, a  Juniper-class seagoing buoy tender commissioned in 1999.

United States Coast Guard ship names